Jaime Alberto Alvarado Hoyos (born 26 July 1999) is a Colombian professional footballer who plays as a midfielder for DIM.

Club career 
Born in Santa Marta, Alvarado joined Watford in 2016, after coming through an Udinese Calcio academy based in Colombia. On 17 July 2017, after spending the previous six months on loan at Granada CF's youth setup, he joined Segunda División B side Real Valladolid B on loan for one year.

Alvarado made his senior debut on 19 August 2017, starting in a 1–1 home draw against AD Unión Adarve, and finished the season with 27 appearances. He remained in the Spanish second division in the following two seasons, serving loan stints at Hércules CF and CF Badalona.

On 23 July 2020, Alvarado moved to Série A side Athletico Paranaense on loan until June 2021. He made his debut for the club on 6 September, coming on as a second-half substitute for Richard in a 1–0 away loss against Vasco da Gama.

On 31 August 2021, Alvarado signed for Racing Ferrol on a season-long loan deal.

Career statistics

Notes

References

External links

1999 births
Living people
Colombian footballers
Colombian expatriate footballers
Colombia youth international footballers
Association football midfielders
Watford F.C. players
Segunda División B players
Real Valladolid Promesas players
Hércules CF players
CF Badalona players
Campeonato Brasileiro Série A players
Club Athletico Paranaense players
Colombian expatriate sportspeople in England
Colombian expatriate sportspeople in Spain
Colombian expatriate sportspeople in Brazil
Expatriate footballers in England
Expatriate footballers in Spain
Expatriate footballers in Brazil
People from Santa Marta
Sportspeople from Magdalena Department
Colombia under-20 international footballers